Tasmanian Devils is a 2013 television film directed by Zach Lipovsky and starring Danica McKellar and Apolo Ohno. The film was first released onto the Syfy channel on January 19, 2013 and revolves around a group of friends who get attacked by extremely large tasmanian devils. Radio Times rated the film poorly, giving it two out of 5 stars.

Plot
When a group of thrill-seeking young adults BASE jump into a forbidden portion of the Tasmanian wilderness, they didn't foresee that one of their group would die in the process. They also didn't expect for their friend's blood to awaken ancient and gigantic Tasmanian devils that would swiftly seek to make them their supper. The group finds some assistance in two park rangers that arrive to arrest the group for trespassing, only to find that they too are in danger of becoming the deadly beasts' prey. One by one people start to die. Whitford is killed by one of the monsters. Then Danz dies next. The rest of the group tries to plan out an idea. In the last part of the movie, Alex reveals that her younger brother died falling from a high tree and that's why she is afraid of heights. In the end, Jayne and Alex share a kiss and survive.

Cast
 Danica McKellar as Alex
 Kenneth Mitchell as Jayne
 Mike Dopud as Anderson
 Roger Cross as Simon 
 Terry Chen as Walsh
 Rekha Sharma as Lisbon
 Apolo Ohno as Stone
Joseph Sutherland as Danz 
 Scott McNeil as Whitfield
Julia Sarah Stone as Kid

Production
SyFy officially announced plans to film Tasmanian Devils on October 18, 2011, and a week later confirmed that Danica McKellar would be cast as the movie's lead character. Lipovsky was brought on as the film's director, which would later prompt WWE Studios to hire him to direct Leprechaun: Origins based on his work with Tasmanian Devils. Filming took place in Canada over an 18-month period. Gizmodo questioned the film's casting of Tasmanian devils as a film villain, as they noted that it was an endangered animal due to Devil facial tumour disease. A conservationist for the Save the Tasmanian Devil Appeal later commented on the film, stating that she felt that few people would take the film seriously and that "if it raises the awareness of the devil overseas, and prompts people to find out more, then it is a good thing."

References

External links
 
 

Syfy original films
2013 horror films
2013 television films
2013 films
Films set in Tasmania
Films shot in Canada
2010s monster movies
American monster movies
2010s English-language films
2010s American films